Yana Vasilyeva (born 28 November 1981) is a Kazakhstani handball player. She was born in Oskemen. She competed at the 2008 Summer Olympics in Beijing, where the Kazakhstani team placed 10th.

References

External links

1981 births
Living people
Sportspeople from Oskemen
Kazakhstani female handball players
Olympic handball players of Kazakhstan
Handball players at the 2008 Summer Olympics
Asian Games medalists in handball
Handball players at the 2006 Asian Games
Asian Games silver medalists for Kazakhstan
Medalists at the 2006 Asian Games
21st-century Kazakhstani women